Teuvo Pentti "Tepi" Länsivuori (born 9 December 1945) is a Finnish former professional motorcycle road racer. He competed in the Grand Prix world championships from 1969 to 1978. 

Länsivuori's most successful seasons were in 1973 when he finished in second place to Giacomo Agostini in the 350cc World Championship, second in the 250 championship to Dieter Braun and won the Finnish round of the 1973 Formula 750 championship. 

In 1976 he competed as a privateer in the 500cc world championship to place second to his former Suzuki  teammate Barry Sheene.

Motorcycle Grand Prix results

(key) (Races in bold indicate pole position)

References

1945 births
Living people
People from Iisalmi
Finnish motorcycle racers
250cc World Championship riders
350cc World Championship riders
500cc World Championship riders
Sportspeople from North Savo